Brăteni may refer to several villages in Romania:

 Brăteni, a village in Sânmihaiu de Câmpie Commune, Bistriţa-Năsăud County
 Brăteni, a village in Dobârceni Commune, Botoşani County

See also 
 Bratu (surname)
 Bratia (disambiguation)
 Brătești (disambiguation)